Drásov is the name of several locations in the Czech Republic and Romania:

 Drásov (Brno-Country District), a market town in the South Moravian Region
 Drásov (Příbram District), a municipality and village in the Central Bohemian Region
 Drașov, a village in Șpring commune in Transylvania, Romania